Kriyamana karma, in Hinduism, is the karma that human beings are creating in the present, the fruits of which will be experienced in the future.

References

See also
Nishkam Karma
Prarabdha karma
Sanchita karma

Karma in Hinduism

zh:現世業